Transmembrane serine protease 7 is a protein that in humans is encoded by the TMPRSS7 gene.

References

Further reading